For information on all Canisius College sports, see Canisius Golden Griffins

The Canisius Golden Griffins men's basketball team, or the Griffs, represent Canisius College in Buffalo, New York, United States. Canisius is a member of the Metro Atlantic Athletic Conference and play their home games at Koessler Center. The head coach is Reggie Witherspoon.

Golden Griffins in the ABA/NBA
Andrew Anderson, played for the Oakland Oaks, Miami Floridians and Los Angeles Stars (1967–70)
Leroy Chollet, played for the Syracuse Nationals (1949–51) 
Larry Fogle, played for the New York Knicks (1975–76)
Herm Hedderick, played for the New York Knicks (1955–56)
Charles Jordan, played for Indiana Pacers (1975–76)
Mike Macaluso, played for Buffalo Braves (1973–74)
Anthony Masiello, played for the Indiana Pacers (1969–70) and later served three terms as mayor of Buffalo (1993–2005).
Bob MacKinnon, played for Syracuse Nationals (1949–50)
Al Masino, played for four teams (1952–54)
Johnny McCarthy, played for the 1963–64 NBA Champion Boston Celtics; first of just four players in NBA history to record a triple-double in their playoff debut with the other three being Luka Dončić, LeBron James and Magic Johnson.
John Morrison, played for Denver Rockets (1967–68)
Mike Smrek ’85, played for the 1986–87 and 1987–88 NBA Champion Los Angeles Lakers
Mel Thurston played for the Tri-City Blackhawks 1940–42

Other notables
Chris Manhertz, signed by Buffalo Bills as undrafted free agent, played for New Orleans Saints, Carolina Panthers, and Jacksonville Jaguars (2015–present)
Eyal Yaffe (born 1960), Israeli basketball player, Israeli Basketball Premier League
Craig Wise (basketball), 1995 Metro Atlantic Athletic Conference Men's Basketball Player of the Year
Darrell Barley, 1996 Metro Atlantic Athletic Conference Men's Basketball Player of the Year

Postseason tournaments

NCAA tournament results
The Griffins have appeared in four NCAA Tournaments. Their combined record is 6–4.

NIT results
The Griffins have appeared in five National Invitation Tournaments (NIT). Their combined record is 5–6.

CIT results
The Griffins have appeared in four CollegeInsider.com Postseason Tournaments (CIT). Their combined record is 4–4.

CBI results
The Griffins have appeared in one College Basketball Invitational. Their record is 0–1.

References

External links